Sandra Eliane Clark is an American diplomat currently serving as the United States Ambassador to Burkina Faso.

Early life and education 

Clark earned her Bachelor of Arts from Swarthmore College and her Juris Doctor from Columbia University School of Law.

Career 

Clark is a career member of the Senior Foreign Service, class of Minister-Counselor. During her diplomatic and State Department career, she has held many positions including Director of the Office of West African Affairs in the Bureau of African Affairs, Senior Fellow at the German Marshall Fund, Deputy Chief of Mission of the United States Embassy Dakar, Senegal, Deputy Coordinator of Assistance to Europe and Eurasia, and as Director of the Office of Economic Policy and Public Diplomacy.

She has also served as the Economic Counselor at the United States Embassy in London, England, Special Assistant to the Under Secretary of State for Economic Growth, Energy, and the Environment, and as Deputy Director in the Office of North Central European Affairs.

Ambassador to Burkina Faso

On August 6, 2019, President Trump announced his intent to nominate Clark to be the next United States Ambassador to Burkina Faso. On September 9, 2019, her nomination was sent to the United States Senate. On May 13, 2020, a hearing on her nomination was held before the Foreign Relations Committee. Her nomination was confirmed on August 6, 2020 by voice vote. She was sworn in on August 12, 2020. She presented her credentials to President Roch Marc Christian Kaboré on September 25, 2020.

Personal life 

Clark speaks French and Russian.

See also
List of ambassadors of the United States

References

Living people
Year of birth missing (living people)
Place of birth missing (living people)
20th-century American women lawyers
20th-century American lawyers
21st-century American diplomats
21st-century American women lawyers
21st-century American lawyers
Ambassadors of the United States to Burkina Faso
American women ambassadors
Columbia Law School alumni
Swarthmore College alumni
United States Foreign Service personnel
United States Department of State officials